Goldenport Park Circuit is a permanent circuit in Jinzhan Township, Chaoyang District, Beijing, People's Republic of China, which is located  north of Beijing. designed by Australian Michael McDonough. The circuit was opened in December 2001 and the development also includes a 4X4 Course, a cinema, a motel and a trading place named as "Auto Mall" trading new and second hand cars.

It held the Beijing round of China Circuit Championship (CCC) for touring cars and China Superbike Championship (CSBK). The circuit became a replacement round of the 2011 FIA GT1 World Championship season after the Curitiba round had been cancelled. The race took place the week after the round held in Ordos, which is also located in China.

In 2014, Goldenport was added to the 2014 World Touring Car Championship season calendar after logistics regarding shipping for overseas rounds forced the FIA to remove the United States race at Sonoma Raceway in California, and add the third Chinese race (Shanghai and Macau are the other two).

The circuit
It is a FIA Class 3 Homologated Circuit with 2 grandstands and 25 pit garages. The circuit has a very smooth surface and very little grip on several sections.

The official fastest race lap records at the Goldenport Park Circuit are listed as:

Notes

References

External links
 
 Map and circuit history at RacingCircuits.info

Sports venues in Beijing
Motorsport venues in Beijing
World Touring Car Championship circuits